Kim Tae-Jin (born October 29, 1984) is a South Korean football player who plays for Gangneung City FC.

References

1984 births
Living people
South Korean footballers
FC Seoul players
Incheon United FC players
Gangneung City FC players
K League 1 players
Korea National League players
Association football midfielders